Three ships have been named after Orion:

French ship Orion (1787), a 74-gun ship of the line
French ship Orion (1813) a 74-gun ship of the line
French submarine Orion, a submarine launched in 1931

French Navy ship names